Inakkili is a 1984 Indian Malayalam film,  directed by Joshiy and produced by M. D. George. The film stars Prem Nazir, Sasikala, Balan K. Nair and Cochin Haneefa in the lead roles. The film has musical score by Shyam.

Plot
Johnny and Nimmy are students in a school who fall in love with each other, but Nimmy's father  Alexander discovers his daughter's affair with Johnny and kills him by gun, then Johnny's father Zachariah avenges his son's death. Nimmy, on the other hand, meets her death at Johnny's grave and the two unite after death.

Cast
Manoj as Johnny
Sasikala as Nimmy
Sukumaran as Father
Prem Nazir as Zachariah
Balan K. Nair as Alexander
Lalu Alex as Raju
Cochin Haneefa as Peter
Paravoor Bharathan as Mathai
Seema as Johny's mother
 M.O Devasya

Soundtrack
The music was composed by Shyam and the lyrics were written by Poovachal Khader.

References

External links
 

1984 films
1980s Malayalam-language films
1984 drama films
Indian drama films